Overboard may refer to:
Man overboard, a situation where a person goes over the side of a ship or boat into the water, possibly needing rescue
Overboard (1987 film), a 1987 movie starring Goldie Hawn and Kurt Russell
Overboard (2018 film), a remake of the 1987 film, starring Anna Faris and Eugenio Derbez
Overboard (comic strip), a comic strip about a group of pirates
Overboard!, a 1997 video game published by Psygnosis
Overboard (a cappella), an all-male a cappella group from New England
"Overboard", a 2010 song by Justin Bieber featuring Jessica Jarrell from My World 2.0